The Battle of Nanjing (1853) began after the fall of Wuhan on March8, 1853, and ended with the fall of the capital city of Nanking on March19, 1853, to Taiping troops, a few days after the Qing Government evacuated the city.

The remaining Qing garrison surrendered to the Taiping, but they were nonetheless executed.

Background
Taiping forces captured Wuchang in January 1853, but instead of marching north and directly attacking Beijing they decided to head east and first take control of Nanjing with a force of 500,000+ men. The floating bridges initially used to in the siege of Wuchang were burned and destroyed to delay Qing advances led by Xiang Rong. Taiping forces took Jiujiang and Anqing in Anhui province virtually unopposed. 

The Taipings reached Nanjing on March 6, with a force that had grown to almost 750,000. The Taiping besieged the city for thirteen days, until three tunnels had been dug beneath city walls in order to plant explosives. Two of them exploded on time but the third one detonated late, killing many Taiping troops in friendly fire. On March 20, Taiping forces reached the Imperial City, the home of the Manchu Garrison and defended by more than 30,000 Manchu bannermen families. Qing forces were unable to contain a Taiping human wave attack and the Inner City fell quickly. The Taipings murdered about 30,000 manchu families of the defeated manchu soldiers after capturing the city.

During the battle the Taiping forces used spies disguised as Buddhist monks who successfully entered the city. They set fires alerting the Taiping where the weak points in the city were.

References 
 Draft History of Qing

1853 in China
History of Nanjing
19th-century rebellions
Peasant revolts
Nanjing 1853
Nanjing 1853
March 1853 events
Eight Banners